Jannie Greeff (4 December 1935 – 12 December 2010) was a South African weightlifter. He competed in the men's middleweight event at the 1956 Summer Olympics.

References

1935 births
2010 deaths
South African male weightlifters
Olympic weightlifters of South Africa
Weightlifters at the 1956 Summer Olympics
Place of birth missing